Sengyou (445–518 AD) was a Buddhist monk and early medieval Chinese bibliographer and noted chiefly for being the author of Collected Records concerning the Tripitaka (出三藏記集 Chu sanzang jìjí, T2145), a catalogue of Buddhist texts translated into Chinese.

Sengyou's ancestral home was Xiapi in Pengcheng Commandery (northwest of modern Suining, Jiangsu). However, his father moved to Jiankang (建康), where he was born. His secular name was Yu. As a young boy he practiced devotions at Jianchu Monastery. At 14, rather than acquiesce to an arranged marriage, he took novice vows and entered Dinglin Monastery, Zhongshan in Jiankang. He was ordained as a bhikkhu aged 20 and received instruction in Vinaya by Faying (d.480). He became renown as a master of the Vinaya.

Chu sanzang jìjí

Although there were earlier works of bibliography with respect to Buddhist texts at the time, Sengyou introduced important innovations in how the texts were arranged, including a hierarchy of authenticity. Not only were Buddhist texts continually trickling in along the Silk Road, but the Chinese had begun to pass off local productions as authentic Indian sutras. Sengyou proposed criteria for assessing the authenticity of Buddhist sutras at a time when many fake or apocryphal texts were in circulation. He was particularly focussed on the translator of a text, and this made him suspicious of unattributed texts. As Tanya Storch says, "Absence of information about the translator was a signal that it might be a compilation by a Chinese person who did not understand Sanskrit and had never studied Buddhism in the west [i.e. India].

The Chu sanzang jìjí is presented in five sections

 A discussion on the provenance of translated scriptures, 
 A record of (new) titles and their listings in earlier catalogues, 
 Prefaces to scriptures,
 Miscellaneous treatises on specific doctrines, and 
 Biographies of translators.

"By subjecting Buddhist scriptures to the textual criticism similar to that applied to the Confucian classics, Sengyou managed to elevate the literary and social status of the Tripiṭaka.” At the Liang court, Sengyou's work was overshadowed by the catalogue of Baochang who produced his catalogue in 521 CE. However, it is Sengyou's catalogue that survives.

Sengyou was assisted in his literary work by his student, Liu Xie, who went on to write an important work on literary aesthetics.

Bibliography

 Buswell, R and Lopez D. (Eds) The Princeton Encyclopedia of Buddhism. 
 Knechtges David R. and Chang Taiping (eds). 2014. Ancient and Early Medieval Chinese Literature (vol. 2) Brill
 Storch, T. (2014). The History of Chinese Buddhist Bibliography. Amherst, NY: Cambria Press.

Notes

445 births
518 deaths
Liu Song Buddhist monks
Chinese bibliographers
Writers from Nanjing
Chinese spiritual writers
Liang dynasty writers
Southern Qi Buddhist monks
Liang dynasty Buddhist monks